Sawdust (also Blockers Shop, Saw Dust Valley, Sawdust Valley, Winnsboro) is an unincorporated community in Maury County, Tennessee, United States.

Notes

Unincorporated communities in Maury County, Tennessee
Unincorporated communities in Tennessee